The 2012 Copa Libertadores de América Finals were the final two-legged tie that decided the winner of the 2012 Copa Libertadores de América, the 53rd edition of the Copa Libertadores de América, South America's premier international club football tournament organized by CONMEBOL.

It was the fourth Libertadores decisive-match Final to be held at the Pacaembu as well as the tenth Final to be held in São Paulo and the seventeenth Final to be held in Brazil. While Corinthians progressed to the knockout stages by finishing top of their group, Boca progressed to the knockout stages by finishing runners-up of their group. Boca then beat Unión Española, Fluminense and Universidad de Chile to reach the finals, while Corinthians knocked out Emelec, Vasco da Gama and defending champions Santos.

In the first leg of the final on 27 June at the Estadio Alberto J. Armando (La Bombonera), Boca Juniors took the lead with a goal from Facundo Roncaglia after 73 minutes when he drove the ball high into the net. Corinthians equalised in the 85th minute when Romarinho lobbed the ball over fallen Boca Juniors goalkeeper Agustín Orión with the game finishing at 1–1.

In the second leg of the final on 4 July at the Estádio Municipal Paulo Machado de Carvalho (Pacaembu), Emerson Sheik scored two second half goals to give Corinthians a 2–0 win.
As a result, Corinthians won their first Copa Libertadores, and finished the tournament undefeated. As winners, Corinthians represented CONMEBOL at the 2012 FIFA Club World Cup, in which they entered at the semifinal stage  and made it to the final, where they defeated Chelsea 1–0. They are also playing against 2012 Copa Sudamericana winners São Paulo in the 2013 Recopa Sudamericana.

Qualified teams

Background
To reach the finals, in the knockout phase Boca defeated Unión Española, Fluminense, and Universidad de Chile (2–0 on aggregate score), while Corinthians overcame Emelec, Vasco da Gama, and the defending champions Santos (2–1 on aggregate).

Boca and Corinthians reached the final having already lost out in their domestic and state leagues respectively (the Torneo Clausura de la Primera División and Paulistão respectively). But Boca having also reached the final of their domestic cup competition (the Copa Argentina), that will play against Racing on August 8 (in other words, after these finals). Meanwhile, Corinthians (that, like the others Brazilians teams in this Libertadores, didn't play their domestic cup – Copa do Brasil – because of schedule conflicts) reached the final occupying 17th place of their domestic league (the Brasileirão).

In their most recent Libertadores finals, Boca won in 2007 to Grêmio 5–0 (3–0 in Buenos Aires, 2–0 in Porto Alegre). While Corinthians had never played a Libertadores/Copa de Campeones finals before, Boca have played in nine Libertadores/Copa de Campeones finals, winning six (1977, 1978, 2000, 2001, 2003 and 2007) and losing three (1963, 1979 and 2004). The two clubs have met each other twice in Americas before, with Boca winning 4–2 on aggregate in the round of 16 of the 1991 Copa Libertadores, and in the group stage of the 2000 Copa Mercosur, with Boca victory 3–0 in Buenos Aires, and a 2–2 draw in São Paulo (as Boca progressed in the competition – would be later eliminated by Atlético Mineiro in quarter-finals -, Corinthians was eliminated in this stage).

Road to finals

Rules
The final is played over two legs; home and away. The higher seeded team plays the second leg at home. The team that accumulates the most points —three for a win, one for a draw, zero for a loss— after the two legs is crowned the champion. Should the two teams be tied on points after the second leg, the team with the best goal difference wins. If the two teams have equal goal difference, the away goals rule is not applied, unlike the rest of the tournament. Extra time is played, which consists of two 15-minute halves. If the tie is still not broken, a penalty shootout ensues according to the Laws of the Game.

Matches

First leg

Second leg

See also
2012 Copa Libertadores Femenina Final
2012 Copa Sudamericana Finals

References

External links
Copa Libertadores  (official website) 

2012
l
l
2012 Copa Libertadores
l
l
2012